Maksim Olegovich Zhigalov (born 26 July 1989) is a Russian volleyball player, member of the Russia men's national volleyball team and Tianjin Food Group.

Sporting achievements

Clubs
 CEV Champions League
  2013/2014 – with Belogorie Belgorod

 FIVB Club World Championship
  Belo Horizonte 2014 – with Belogorie Belgorod

 National championships
 2009/2010  Russian Championship, with Belogorie Belgorod
 2012/2013  Russian Cup, with Belogorie Belgorod
 2012/2013  Russian Championship, with Belogorie Belgorod
 2013/2014  Russian SuperCup, with Belogorie Belgorod
 2013/2014  Russian Cup, with Belogorie Belgorod
 2014/2015  Russian SuperCup, with Belogorie Belgorod
 2014/2015  Russian Championship, with Belogorie Belgorod

Universiade
 2013  Summer Universiade

Individual awards
 2013: Summer Universiade – Most Valuable Player
 2013: Summer Universiade – Best Opposite

References

External links
 Player profile at CEV.eu
 Player profile at PlusLiga.pl
 Player profile at WorldofVolley.com
 Player profile at Volleybox.net

1989 births
Living people
People from Shymkent
Russian men's volleyball players
Universiade medalists in volleyball
Universiade gold medalists for Russia
Medalists at the 2013 Summer Universiade
Medalists at the 2015 Summer Universiade
European Games medalists in volleyball
European Games bronze medalists for Russia
Volleyball players at the 2015 European Games
Russian expatriate sportspeople in Poland
Expatriate volleyball players in Poland
VC Belogorie players
Czarni Radom players